Iliamna corei is a rare species of flowering plant in the mallow family known by the common name Peters Mountain mallow. It is endemic to Virginia in the United States, where it is known only from Peters Mountain in Giles County. A single occurrence remains. This is a federally listed endangered species. It is considered "one of the rarest native plants in the United States."

This species has sometimes been included within the description of Iliamna remota, but genetic analysis suggests it be maintained as a species in its own right.

This plant is a perennial herb producing an erect stem up to 1.5 meters tall and bearing pink flowers. The leaves are divided into wide, pointed lobes and the herbage is hairy.

There is one small population of this plant located on Peters Mountain in western Virginia. In 1990, this population contained only three or four individuals. The plants grow on nooks in a sandstone outcrop that have accumulated a small amount of soil. The population is so small that remaining individuals are inbred. Conservation efforts are focused on increasing the plant's numbers to improve genetic diversity.

This plant is dependent on wildfire. Its seeds require scarification in order to germinate. This is naturally accomplished during fires, when the heat breaks the tough outer layer of the seed. When plants are propagated by hand, the seeds must be scarified by nicking the outer surface with a blade or soaking them in acid or boiling water. A conservation plan for the species will include establishing a normal fire regime for the habitat.

References

Malveae
Flora of Virginia
Flora of the Appalachian Mountains
Endemic flora of the United States
Critically endangered flora of the United States